Keyser Township School 8 is a historic school building located at Garrett, DeKalb County, Indiana.  It was built in 1914, and is a one-story, Romanesque Revival-style brick building on a raised basement. It has a hipped roof. The building was converted to apartments in 1956.

It was added to the National Register of Historic Places in 1983.

References

School buildings on the National Register of Historic Places in Indiana
Romanesque Revival architecture in Indiana
School buildings completed in 1914
Buildings and structures in DeKalb County, Indiana
National Register of Historic Places in DeKalb County, Indiana
1914 establishments in Indiana